() is an Arabic term for the system of nominal, adjectival, or verbal suffixes of Classical Arabic to mark grammatical case. Even in Literary Arabic, these suffixes are often not pronounced in pausa; i.e. when the word occurs at the end of the sentence, in accordance with certain rules of Arabic pronunciation. (That is, the nunation suffix -n is generally dropped at the end of a sentence or line of poetry, with the notable exception of the nuniyya; the vowel suffix may or may not be, depending on the requirements of metre.) Arabic without case endings may require a different and fixed word order, similar to spoken Arabic dialects.

Etymology 
The term literally means 'making [the word] Arabic'. It is the stem IV masdar of the root ‘-r-b, meaning "to be fluent", so  means "making a thing expressed, disclosed or eloquent". The term is cognate to the word Arab itself.

Grammatical cases 
Cases, however, are marked in the Qur'an, children's books, and to remove ambiguous situations. If marked, it is shown at the end of the noun. Further information on the types of declensions is discussed in the following section, along with examples. Grammatical case endings are not pronounced in pausa and in less formal forms of Arabic. Note that in vocalised Arabic (where vowel points are written), the case endings may be written even if they are not pronounced. Some Arabic textbooks or children's books skip case endings in vocalised Arabic, thus allowing both types of pronunciation.

Nominative case 
The nominative is used in several situations:
 For the subject of a verbal sentence.
 For the subject and predicate of a non-verbal (equational) sentence, with some notable exceptions.
 For certain adverbs.
 For the citation form of words.

For singular nouns and broken plurals, it is marked as a usually unwritten   for the definite or  + nunation for the indefinite. The dual and regular masculine plural are formed by adding  -an(i) and   respectively (just  - and  - in the construct state).

Accusative case 
The accusative has several uses:
 The subject of an equational (non-verbal) sentence, if it is initiated with  inna, or one of its sisters. The particles are subordinating conjunctions which require that the subject of the subordinate (complement) clause be in the accusative case.
 The predicate of  /   "be" and its sisters (there are 13 of these verbs). Hence,   'the girl is beautiful' but   'the girl was beautiful' (note that "beautiful" is spelled the same way in both cases).
 As the complement of verbs of "seeming".
 The object of a transitive verb
 Most adverbs.
 Semi-prepositions.
 Internal object/cognate accusative structure
 The accusative of specification.
 The accusative of purpose.
 The circumstantial accusative.
 Objects of  'how much/how many'.
 Cardinal and ordinal numbers from 11, and 13-19
 Counted nouns of numbers 11–99
 Exclamation of astonishment. i.e.: ,  'Oh, how beautiful she is!'
 Vocative first term of construct.   "Oh, Abdallah!"
 Nouns following exceptive particles in non-negative sentences.
 The noun following the absolute, or categorical, negation   "No".

For singular nouns and broken plurals, it is marked as a usually unwritten   for the definite or  + nunation for the indefinite. Note that this is the only case (when alif is written), which affects the unvocalised written Arabic (e.g.  ). The dual and regular masculine plural are formed by adding   and   respectively (spelled identically!) Some forms of indefinite accusative are mandatory even for spoken and pausal forms of Arabic, sometimes  is changed to a simple  in pausa or spoken Arabic.

Diptotes never take an alif ending in the written Arabic and are never pronounced with the ending .

Genitive case 
The genitive case
 Objects of prepositions.
 The object of a locative adverb.
 Elative (comparative/superlative) adjectives behave similarly:   'tallest boy'.

For singular nouns and broken plurals, it is marked as a usually unwritten   for the definite or  + nunation for the indefinite.

 Note: there is no dative case. Instead, the preposition   is used.

Types of declension

Fully declined nouns (triptotes) 

This system applies to most singular nouns in Arabic. It also applies to many "broken plurals".

The final  is dropped when the noun is preceded by the definite article ). Thus:

Nominative (literally, "raised"):
  :  a house 
  : the house
  : the house of the man.

Accusative;
literally, 'erected'):
  :  a house 
  : the house
  : the house of the man.

Genitive (literally, 'dragged'):
  : a house
  : the house
  : the house of the man.

The final  is also dropped in classical poetry at the end of a couplet, and the vowel of the ending is pronounced long.

Diptotes 

Diptotes never take an alif in the accusative case in written Arabic.

Sound masculine plurals 

These stay the same whether   precedes or not. The final -a is usually dropped in speech. In less formal Arabic only  is used for all cases and the final  is dropped in pausa and in less formal Arabic.

Thus:

Nominative:
 wālidūna: parents (more than two)
 al-wālidūna: the parents
 wālidū r-rijāli: the parents of the men

Accusative and genitive:
 wālidīna: parents
 al-wālidīna: the parents
 wālidī r-rijāli: the parents of the men

Note: ending  -īna is spelled identically to  -ayni (see above).

Sound feminine plurals 

In the case of sound feminine plurals, the suffixes are respectively  -ātu(n),  -āti(n) and  -āti(n) (identical spelling).  The n is only there when the noun is indefinite (not preceded by ).  Again the final vowel is dropped in speech and pausa, leaving only  -, making all cases pronounced identically.

Nominative:
 mudarrisātun: (female) teachers
 al-mudarrisātu: the teachers
 : the teachers of the children

Accusative and genitive:
 mudarrisātin: (female) teachers
 al-mudarrisāti: the teachers
 : the teachers of the children

Other declensional paradigms 

The Dual - These nouns denote two of something. They decline very similarly to the sound masculine plurals because they are not marked for definiteness and look the same in both the accusative and genitive cases. For the nominative, the marking is -āni and for the accusative/genitive, -ayni. An example is "parents," which is wālidāni and wālidayni respectively.

  (deficient nouns ending with  ) - These nouns behave differently due to the instability of the final vowel. When indefinite, these nouns take a final -in in the nominative/genitive, and -iyan in the accusative. When definite, they take a long -ī in the nominative/genitive, and -iya in the accusative. These nouns were reckoned by the grammarians to have originally taken the triptotic endings, but through morpho-phonotactic processes, the latter resulted. An example is "judge," which is qāḍin, qāḍiyan, versus , and al-qāḍiya respectively. Also, a noun can be both  and diptotal: for example, layālin 'nights', is a broken plural with a final unstable vowel.

These nouns are marked only for definiteness, as morpho-phonotactic processes have resulted in the complete loss of the case distinctions. When indefinite, they take -an, which rests on an alif maqṣūrah or occasionally . An example is "hospital," which is mustashfan and  respectively. If a noun is both  and diptotic, then it is completely invariable for case.

Also, nouns that are both  and diptotic fall into this category. Additionally, there are rare invariable nouns which have other endings, like any name ending with "-ayhi," like Sībawayhi (colloquially pronounced, for example, in Egypt: . Another example is  'world'.

Sentence structure 

A noun's case depends on the role that the noun plays in the sentence.  There are multiple sentence structures in Arabic, each of which demands different case endings for the roles in the sentence.  "Subject" does not always correspond to "nominative", nor does "object" always correspond to "accusative". Sentences in Arabic are divided into two branches, of which are the incomplete phrases (jumla inshaiya) and the complete phrases (jumla khabariya). Jumla inshaiya is composed of the descriptive phrase and possessive phrase, while the jumla khabariya is made up of the verbal sentence (jumla fi'lya khabariya) and the nominal sentence (jumla ismiya khabariya). The incomplete phrase cannot be a sentence in itself, and is usually used in the complete phrases.

Verbal sentences 

In a verbal sentence, there is verb–subject–object word order.  This is the preferred word order of Classical Arabic.

In a verbal sentence, the subject takes nominative case and the object takes accusative case.  Such a sentence ("This writer wrote the written") would be formed as follows (read from right to left):

Nominal sentences 

In a nominal sentence, there is subject–verb–object word order.

Equations (no copula verb) 
If the verb would be "is" (that is, the predicate merely attributes something to the subject—see Predicative (adjectival or nominal)), then there is no verb used.  Both the subject and the predicate take nominative case when there is no overt verb.  Such a sentence ("This writer is famous") is formed as follows (read from right to left):

Overt verb 

If there is an overt verb, the subject takes nominative and the predicate takes accusative.  Such a sentence ("This writer wrote the book") is formed as follows (read from right to left):

Sisters of inna 

Among them are:
  –  (particle for emphasis, close to "it is the case that")
  –  ('that')
  – lākinna (but)
  –  ('because')
  –  ('as if', 'as though')

If one of the sisters of  begins a clause, then the subject takes accusative case instead of nominative.

Such a sentence using the particle  ("Verily, this writer wrote the book") would be formed as follows (read from right to left):

Note that although there was an overt verb in the above example, a nominal sentence without an overt verb will also have its subject take accusative case because of the introduction of one of 's sisters.  (The predicate of an equation is unaffected and will remain in the nominative.)

Consider the following example ("Verily, this writer is famous"):

With sisters of kāna 

The verb  and its sisters form a class of 13 verbs that mark the time/duration of actions, states, and events.

Sentences that use these verbs are considered to be a type of nominal sentence according to Arabic grammar, not a type of verbal sentence.  Although the word order may seem to be verb–subject–object when there is no other verb in the sentence, note that it is possible to have a sentence in which the order is subject–verb–object.  Such a non-equation sentence clearly shows subject–verb–object word order.

Among the sisters of kāna are:
  –  ('was')
  –  ('not')
  –   ('still'; literally, 'has not ceased to be')
  –  ('to reach a state, become')
  –  ('to remain')

If one of the sisters of  begins a clause, then the subject takes nominative case and the object takes accusative case.  (Note that because of this, Arabic contrasts [The man]NOM is [a doctor]NOM in the present tense with [The man]NOM was [a doctor]ACC in the past tense.)

Such a sentence using the verb  ("This writer was famous") would be formed as follows (read from right to left):

In a sentence with an explicit verb, the sister of kāna marks aspect for the actual verb.  A sentence like  (was the.writer he.writes the.book, 'the writer was writing the book'), for instance, has both a main verb and a sister of kāna that indicates the non-completed aspect of the main verb.

Verbs 

The imperfective tense of the verb also has suffixed vowels, which determine the mood of the verb, There are six moods in the Classical Arabic, Thus:

 , indicative, means 'he writes' and  means "he will write";
 , subjunctive, is used in phrases such as "so that he should write";
 , jussive (literally meaning 'clipped off'), means 'let him write'. This can become  when required for euphony, e.g. when followed by two consonants.
 , Imperative, means "write!";
 , short energetic; its meaning is dependent upon the prefix that is attached to it, but it often means "he (should) write";
 , long energetic; its meaning is dependent upon the prefix that is attached to it, but it often means "he (must) write".
All the first three forms are spelled  in unvocalised Arabic, and the final vowel is not pronounced in pausa and in informal Arabic, leaving just one pronunciation: .

Traditional Arab grammarians equated the indicative with the nominative of nouns, the subjunctive with the accusative, and the jussive with the genitive, as indicated by their names (the only pair that is not borne out in the name is the jussive-genitive pair, probably because the  vowel is usually dropped). It is not known whether there is a genuine historical connection or whether the resemblance is mere coincidence, caused by the fact that these are the only three short vowels available.

See also 
 Arabic grammar
 Tashkīl
 Mater lectionis
 Mimation

References 

 Kristen Brustad, Mahmoud Al-Batal, Abbas Al-Tonsi, A Textbook for Arabic: Part Two: Washington, DC 1997, 
 Haywood and Nahmad, A new Arabic grammar: London 1965, 
 Aryeh Levin, "The Fundamental Principles of the Arab Grammarians' Theory of ‘amal", in: Jerusalem Studies in Arabic and Islam 19 (1995), pp. 214–232.
 John Mace, Arabic Grammar: A Reference Guide: Edinburgh 2002, 
 Ryding, Karin C., A Reference Grammar of Modern Standard Arabic
 Jalajel, David Solomon, Expressing I'rab: The Presentation of Arabic Grammatical Analysis: Bellville: University of the Western Cape 2011,

External links 
 Classical Arabic Blog
 Irab and syntactic analysis, and grammatical checking

Arabic grammar
Linguistic morphology